Izabella Antonowicz-Szuszkiewicz (born March 16, 1942 in Vilnius) is a Polish sprint canoer who competed from the mid-1960s to the early 1970s. Competing in three Summer Olympics, she earned her best finish of sixth in the K-2 500 m event at Munich in 1972.

Antonowicz's husband, Władysław (1938–2007), also competed as a sprint canoer during the 1960s and 1970s.

References
 Sports-reference.com profile
 PKOl profile

1942 births
Canoeists at the 1964 Summer Olympics
Canoeists at the 1968 Summer Olympics
Canoeists at the 1972 Summer Olympics
Living people
Olympic canoeists of Poland
Polish female canoeists
Sportspeople from Vilnius
20th-century Polish women